JKH GKS Jastrzębie is an ice hockey team in Jastrzębie Zdrój, Poland. The team plays in the Polska Hokej Liga, the top level league in Poland. They won the Polish Cup for the first time in their history, in 2012/2013. They defeated the reigning champions Ciarko PBS Bank KH Sanok in the final.

Players

  David Marek
  Ondrej Raszka
  Jakub Giminski
  Kamil Gorny
  Henrich Jabornik
  Māris Jass
  Arkadiusz Kostek
  Artem Iossafov
  Martin Kasperlik
  Jesse Rohtla
  Maciej Urbanowicz

External links
 Official Website

Ice hockey teams in Poland
Sport in Jastrzębie-Zdrój